"Cotton-Eyed Joe" (also known as "Cotton-Eye Joe") is a traditional American country folk song popular at various times throughout the United States and Canada, although today it is most commonly associated with the American South. The song is also an instrumental banjo and bluegrass fiddle standard.

"Cotton-Eyed Joe" has inspired both a partner dance and more than one line dance that is often danced at country dance venues in the United States and around the world. The 1980 film Urban Cowboy sparked a renewed interest in the dance. In 1985, The Moody Brothers' version of the song received a Grammy Award nomination for Best Country Instrumental Performance. Irish group The Chieftains received a Grammy nomination for Best Country Vocal Collaboration for their version of the song with lead vocals by Ricky Skaggs on their 1992 album Another Country. In 1994 a version of the song recorded by the Swedish band Rednex as "Cotton Eye Joe" became popular worldwide.

History

19th century 
The origins of this song are unclear, although it pre-dates the 1861–1865 American Civil War. American folklorist Dorothy Scarborough (1878–1935) noted in her 1925 book On the Trail of Negro Folk-songs that several people remembered hearing the song before the war. Scarborough's account of the song came from her sister, Mrs. George Scarborough, who learned the song from "the Negroes on a plantation in Texas, and other parts from a man in Louisiana". The man in Louisiana knew the song from his earliest childhood and heard slaves singing it on plantations. Both the dance and the song had many variants.

A number of possible meanings of the term "cotton-eyed" have been proposed. The phrase may refer to: being drunk on moonshine, or having been blinded by drinking wood alcohol, turning the eyes milky white; a black person with very light blue eyes; miners covered in dirt with the exception of their white eyes; someone whose eyes were milky white from bacterial infections of trachoma or syphilis, cataracts or glaucoma; or the contrast of dark skin tone around white eyeballs in black people. Another theory is that the phrase "cotton eyed" is the process of which a person is enucleated and the eyeball is replaced with a cotton ball due to lack of medical equipment and surgical professionals.

American publishing house Harper and Brothers published the first printed version of the song in 1882. It was heard by author Louise Clarke Pyrnelle (born 1850) on the Alabama plantation of her father when she was a child. That 1882 version was republished as follows in 1910:

Cotton-eyed Joe, Cotton-eyed Joe, 
What did make you sarve me so, 
Fur ter take my gal erway fum me, 
An' cyar her plum ter Tennessee? 
Ef it hadn't ben fur Cotton-eyed Joe, 
I'd er been married long ergo.

His eyes wuz crossed, an' his nose wuz flat, 
An' his teef wuz out, but wat uv dat? 
Fur he wuz tall, an' he wuz slim, 
An' so my gal she follered him. 
Ef it hadn't ben fur Cotton-eyed Joe, 
I'd er been married long ergo.

No gal so hansum could be foun', 
Not in all dis country roun', 
Wid her kinky head, an' her eyes so bright, 
Wid her lips so red an' her teef so white. 
Ef it hadn't ben fur Cotton-eyed Joe, 
I'd been married long ergo.

An' I loved dat gal wid all my heart, 
An' she swo' fum me she'd never part; 
But den wid Joe she runned away, 
An' lef' me hyear fur ter weep all day.

O Cotton-eyed Joe, O Cotton-eyed Joe, 
What did make you sarve me so? 
O Joe, ef it hadn't er ben fur you, 
I'd er married dat gal fur true.

By 1884, the fiddle-based song was referred to as "an old, familiar air". In 1925, another version was recorded by folklorist Dorothy Scarborough and published.
Don't you remember, don't you know,
Don't you remember Cotton-eyed Joe?
Cotton-eyed Joe, Cotton-eyed Joe,
What did make you treat me so?
I'd 'a' been married forty year ago
Ef it had n't a-been for Cotton-eyed Joe!

Cotton-eyed Joe, Cotton-eyed Joe,
He was de nig dat sarved me so, —
Tuck my gal away fum me,
Carried her off to Tennessee.
I'd 'a' been married forty year ago
If it had n't a-been for Cotton-eyed Joe.

Hi's teeth was out an' his nose was flat,
His eyes was crossed, — but she did n't mind dat.
Kase he was tall, and berry slim,
An' so my gal she follered him.
I'd 'a' been married forty year ago
Ef it had n't a-been for Cotton-eyed Joe.

She was de prettiest gal to be found
Anywhar in de country round;
Her lips was red an' her eyes was bright,
Her skin was black but her teeth was white.
I'd 'a' been married forty year ago
Ef it had n't a-been for Cotton-eyed Joe.

Dat gal, she sho' had all my love,
An swore fum ne she'd never move,
But Joe hoodooed her, don't you see,
An' she run off wid him to Tennessee,
I'd 'a' been married forty years ago,
Ef it hadn't a-been for Cotton-eyed Joe.

Scarborough noted that the song seemed to be well known in the South prior to the Civil War, and parts of it had been sent in by various persons.

Over the years, many different versions of the song have been performed and/or recorded with many different versions of the lyrics (and many without lyrics).
"Cotton-Eyed Joe", on occasion referred to as "The South Texas National Anthem", was played for minstrel-type jigs, and it has long been popular as a square dance hoedown and a couple dance polka.

A resident of Central Texas who learned the dance in Williamson County in the early 1880s described it as nothing but a heel and toe "poker" with fringes added. These fringes added to the heel and toe polka were clog steps which required skill and extraversion on the part of the dancer.

20th century 

During the first half of the 20th century, the song was a widely known folk song all over English-speaking North America. One discography lists 134 recorded versions released since 1950. In more recent decades, the song has waned in popularity in most regions except some parts of the American South, where it is still a popular folk song.

Bob Wills and Adolph Hofner and his San Antonians both recorded the song, and according to music historian Bill C. Malone, Hofner's 1941 version was the one that did the most to popularize the song. A 1967 instrumental version of the song by Al Dean inspired a new round dance polka for couples.

The dance remained popular in Texas in the 1970s. A circle dance called "Cotton-Eyed Joe" can be found in the 1975 edition of Encyclopedia of Social Dance. The men stand on the inside of a circle facing out, and the women stand on the outside facing in; both circles follow a sequence of kick steps and struts.

The spoke line version gained popularity not only in Texas, but also across the US and overseas. in the 1980s. A Western "craze" followed the 1980 release of Urban Cowboy. In Merle Haggard's "Texas Fiddle Song" (1981), the final verse makes reference to the "Cotton-Eyed Joe" and features the melody of both the Bob Wills and Al Dean versions. "Cotton-Eyed Joe" and its continued popularity in Texas, were referred to in the lyrics to Alabama's 1984 song "If You're Gonna Play in Texas".

Rednex version and other modern covers

In August 1994, Swedish Eurodance group Rednex covered the song as "Cotton Eye Joe" for their album Sex & Violins, combining their style with traditional American instruments, such as banjos, and fiddles. In 2002, "Cotton Eye Joe" was remixed in a dance version, and was released from Rednex's greatest hits album, The Best of the West.

The Rednex version of the song (using "Eye" instead of "Eyed"), along with a dance-mix version, was very successful in Europe, where it remained at number one in Norway for 15 weeks, Switzerland for 13 weeks, Germany for 10 weeks, Sweden for 8 weeks, Austria for 7 weeks, 3 weeks on the UK Singles Chart and 2 weeks on the Dutch Top 40. In Oceania, it topped the New Zealand Singles Chart for 6 consecutive weeks. In Australia it peaked at number 8 in April 1995. In the US, it peaked at number 25 in March 1995.

The Country and Irish singer Lee Matthews released his version of the song with new added lyrics. The single on his own independent label topped the Irish Country Singles Download Chart in January 2015.

Virtual band Gummibär also covered the song in their album La La Love to Dance.

Select list of recorded versions 
Fiddlin' John Carson (earliest known recording)
1928: Gid Tanner's Skillet Lickers, Columbia 15283D, 4/10/1928
1928: Pope's Arkansas Mountaineers, Victor 21469-A, recorded 2/6/28, Memphis, TN.
1941: Burl Ives on the album, The Wayfaring Stranger
1942: Adolph Hofner and his San Antonians, with J. R. Chatwell on fiddle
1947: Bob Wills and the Texas Playboys
1959: New Lost City Ramblers on the album, Old Timey Songs for Children
1959: Nina Simone on the album, Nina Simone at Town Hall
1960: Walter Brennan
1962: Karen Dalton on the album, Cotton Eyed Joe
1967: Al Dean and the All Stars on the 45 record, KIKN Records

1968: Terry Callier on the album, The New Folk Sound of Terry Callier
1974: Isaac Payton Sweat on the album “Country Masters”
1976: Leona Williams on the album, San Quentin's First Lady
1980: Johnny Gimble with Willie Nelson on the soundtrack album for the movie Honeysuckle Rose
1985: Asleep at the Wheel on their self-titled album, Asleep at the Wheel
1985: The Moody Brothers on their self-titled album, The Moody Brothers, Grammy-nominated
1992: The Chieftains with Ricky Skaggs on the album, Another Country, Grammy-nominated
1992: Michelle Shocked released a reworked version of the song, titled "Prodigal Daughter (Cotton Eyed Joe)," on the album Arkansas Traveler
1993 The Red Clay Ramblers, on the album The Red Clay Ramblers Live.
1994: Black Lace, released under the song title, Bullshit
1994: Rednex on the album, Sex & Violins
1997: Isaac Payton Sweat on the album, “The Color of Music: Cotton Eyed Joe”
2003: Vanessa-Mae on the album, The Ultimate Vanessa-Mae
2004: The Ebony Hillbillies on the album, Sabrina's Holiday
2010: Josh Rouse on the album, "El Turista"
2010: Hot Club of Cowtown
2014: Lee Matthews, Country and Irish singer, produced a version that topped the Irish Country Singles chart.
2016: The Sweeplings on the album, Covers, Ch. 1 
2017: Daniel Radcliffe, Andy Hull, and Robert McDowell, for the film Swiss Army Man
2022: Roger McGuinn. at the Folk Den.

See also
List of UK Singles Chart number ones of the 1990s

References

External links
"Cotton-Eyed Joe" in The Mudcat Cafe's Digital Tradition Folk Music Database
Grateful Dead Family Discography of recordings of "Cotton Eye Joe"
Samples from the Skillet Lickers and RedNex versions
Cotton-Eyed Joe at Roud Folk Song Index

American folk dances
American folk songs
Burl Ives songs
Line dances
Nina Simone songs
Songs about Texas
Songwriter unknown
Year of song unknown
Ophthalmic conditions emphasizing symbolism